NA-211 Sanghar-III is a constituency for the National Assembly of Pakistan.

Election 2002 

General elections were held on 10 Oct 2002. Haji Khuda Bux Nizamani of PML-F won by 61,741 votes.

Election 2008 

General elections were held on 18 Feb 2008. Muhammad Jadam Mangrio of PML-F won by 71,394 votes.

Election 2013 

General elections were held on 11 May 2013. Pir Bux Junejo of PML-F won by 90,787 votes and became the member of National Assembly.

Election 2018 

General elections are scheduled to be held on 25 July 2018.

See also
NA-210 Sanghar-II
NA-212 Mirpur Khas-I

References

External links 
Election result's official website

NA-234